Weblogs may refer to: 

Plural of Blog
Weblogs, Inc.